Swinley Park and Brick Pits is an  biological Site of Special Scientific Interest east of Bracknell in Berkshire, United Kingdom. It is part of the Crown Estate.

The park is mainly a conifer plantation with scattered ancient oaks, sweet chestnuts and beech trees. Decaying trees have many rare species of insect. Swinley Brick Pits have several small pools which provide a habitat for dragonflies and waterfowl, as well as breeding sites for all three species of newts and a colony of marsh clubmoss.

There is access to the park from New Forest Ride.

References

 
Sites of Special Scientific Interest in Berkshire